Chaptalia albicans, the white sunbonnet, is a plant species native to Mexico, Central America and the West Indies. It is known from Jamaica, Cuba, Guatemala, Belize, Honduras, southern Florida (only in Miami-Dade County), the Bahamas, Hispaniola, Puerto Rico, San Luis Potosí, Veracruz, Yucatán, Campeche and Chiapas.

Chaptalia albicans is a herb forming a rosette of leaves. Leaves are elliptical, with margins that are wavy or slightly toothed but not lobed. Flowering stalks up to 15 cm tall at flowering time, 40 cm when the fruits are mature. Heads erect, with ray flowers up to 0.3 mm across. Achenes are up to 12 mm long, with a thread-like beak 50-67% as long as the body of the achene, usually hairless.

References

Mutisieae
Flora of Florida
Flora of the Bahamas
Flora of the Caribbean
Flora of Central America
Flora of Mexico
Plants described in 1781
Flora without expected TNC conservation status